Carl J. Henry (born August 16, 1960) is an American former professional basketball player. He was a 6'6", 205 lb shooting guard.

Born in Hollis, Oklahoma, Henry attended and played collegiately at both the University of Kansas and Oklahoma City University.  Henry led Kansas in scoring in both 1982–83 and 1983–84, averaging 16.8 points per game as a junior, and 17.4 points per game in his senior season. He was selected with the tenth pick of the 4th round (80th overall) in the 1984 National Basketball Association Draft by the Kansas City Kings. His NBA career lasted 28 games with the Sacramento Kings in 1985–86 (by then the franchise had relocated from Kansas City, Missouri). Henry last played basketball in 1993 for Bobcat Gent in Belgium. Henry then became an AAU basketball coach and a personal trainer for pro-basketball prospects.

Carl's son Xavier Henry was the 12th pick in the 2010 NBA draft. His other son, C. J. Henry, played for the University of Kansas's basketball team after transferring from Memphis and is a former minor league prospect for the New York Yankees. Carl's wife attended Kansas as a student-athlete for the women's basketball team.

References

External links
 

1960 births
Living people
African-American basketball players
American men's basketball players
Basketball players from Oklahoma
Kansas City Kings draft picks
Kansas Jayhawks men's basketball players
Oklahoma City Stars men's basketball players
People from Hollis, Oklahoma
Sacramento Kings players
Shooting guards
21st-century African-American people
20th-century African-American sportspeople